Not to be confused with Bhagyalaxmi 1943  and several other films of similar transliteration

Bhagya Laxmi is a Bollywood film. It was released in 1944.

Cast 
 Shanta Apte
 Prem Adib
 Vasanti
 Agha
 Rajkumari Shukla 
 Moni Chatterjee 
 Gulam Rasool

References

External links
 

1944 films
1940s Hindi-language films
Indian black-and-white films
Films directed by Sarvottam Badami